The Twenty-Sixth Wisconsin Legislature convened from  to  in regular session.  

Senators representing odd-numbered districts were newly elected for this session and were serving the first year of a two-year term. Assembly members were elected to a one-year term. Assembly members and odd-numbered senators were elected in the general election of November 5, 1872. Senators representing even-numbered districts were serving the second year of their two-year term, having been elected in the general election held on November 7, 1871.

Major events
 February 11, 1873: King Amadeo I of Spain was deposed and the First Spanish Republic was proclaimed.
 March 4, 1873: Second inauguration of President Ulysses S. Grant.
 March 23, 1873: Wisconsin Lieutenant Governor Milton Pettit died in office.
 May 7, 1873: Salmon P. Chase, Chief Justice of the United States, died of a stroke at New York City.
 September 18, 1873: The New York stock market crashed, leading to the Panic of 1873 and the Long Depression.
 September 24, 1873: Wisconsin Democrats convened in Milwaukee with Grangers and Liberal Republicans to form the short-lived Reform Party, and nominated William Robert Taylor as their candidate for Governor.
 November 5, 1873: William Robert Taylor elected Governor of Wisconsin.
 December 23, 1873: The Woman's Christian Temperance Union was founded at Hillsboro, Ohio.

Major legislation
 March 14, 1873: An Act to provide for finishing the state capitol, protecting the same against fire, for the improvement of the capitol park, and appropriating money to pay for the same, 1873 Act 168.
 March 17, 1873: An Act to provide for the collection of certain statistics with a view of more fully equalizing the state taxes, 1873 Act 210.
 March 17, 1873: An Act to prevent the careless use of firearms, 1873 Act 212.
 March 18, 1873: An Act to provide for annexing and excluding territory to and from cities, towns and villages, and to unite cities, towns and villages, 1873 Act 234.
 March 18, 1873: Joint Resolution ratifying proposed constitutional amendment prohibiting counties, towns, villages, etc., from becoming indebted for any purpose to an amount exceeding five percent of the value of taxable property, 1873 Joint Resolution 4.

Party summary

Senate summary

Assembly summary

Sessions
 1st Regular session: January 8, 1873March 20, 1873

Leaders

Senate leadership
 President of the Senate: Milton Pettit (R)
 President pro tempore: Henry L. Eaton (R)

Assembly leadership
 Speaker of the Assembly: Henry D. Barron (R)

Members

Members of the Senate
Members of the Senate for the Twenty-Sixth Wisconsin Legislature:

Members of the Assembly
Members of the Assembly for the Twenty-Sixth Wisconsin Legislature:

Employees

Senate employees
 Chief Clerk: J. H. Waggoner
 Assistant Clerk: Sid. A. Foster
 Bookkeeper: T. S. Ansley
 Engrossing Clerk: Charles A. Booth
 Enrolling Clerk: Frank Abbott
 Transcribing Clerk: S. H. Vedder
 Sergeant-at-Arms: A. Emonson
 Assistant Sergeant-at-Arms: Stephen Coburn
 Postmaster: P. H. Parsons
 Assistant Postmaster: W. D. Harshaw
 Doorkeeper: Hugh Longstaff
 Assistant Doorkeeper: Walter Cook
 Assistant Doorkeeper: W. F. Bingham
 Assistant Doorkeeper: W. F. Hals
 Assistant Doorkeeper: John Z. Rittman
 Gallery Doorkeeper: G. Jones
 Gallery Doorkeeper: S. S. Miller
 Night Watch: Frank J. Wood
 Governor's Attendant: Ossian M. Pettit
 Clerk's Messenger: Charles A. Irish
 Messengers:
 Adolph Hastreiter
 Arthur Johnson
 Freddie Richards
 Willie Bintliff
 Eddie McCurdy
 Johnnie Veeder
 Charlie Fellows
 Frank Bolting
 Freddie Davis

Assembly employees
 Chief Clerk: Ephraim W. Young
 Assistant Clerk: Fred A. Dennett
 Bookkeeper: Roger C. Spooner
 Engrossing Clerk: Mrs. R. A. Vilas
 Enrolling Clerk: Amos Hitchcock
 Transcribing Clerk: Faunie Russell
 Sergeant-at-Arms: O. C. Bissell
 1st Assistant Sergeant-at-Arms: W. H. Bell
 2nd Assistant Sergeant-at-Arms: Richard Pritchard
 Postmaster: M. Herrick
 1st Assistant Postmaster: W. W. Baker
 2nd Assistant Postmaster: Charles Volner
 Doorkeepers: 
 John Gale
 George W. Baker
 S. G. Parkhurst
 W. W. Phelps
 Night Watch: Fred Bright
 Firemen:
 Charles Sellers
 Z. B. Russell
 Gallery Attendants: 
 John Bowen
 H. J. Stordock
 Committee Room Attendants:
 George W. Williams
 M. S. Bowler
 Ethan Griffith
 George Slingsby
 Eugene J. Cole
 Washroom Attendant: O. M. Oleson
 Porter: H. O. Hermonson
 Speaker's Messenger: Willie Holmes
 Chief Clerk's Messenger: Frank R. Norton
 Sergeant-at-Arms' Messenger: Eddie B. Weeks
 Messengers:
 Charles Murphy
 Frank Porter
 Henry Cutler
 Ed. Hubbell
 Edwin Roweliff
 Cassius Paine
 John Lannan
 Willie Rudd
 Charles Wootton
 Julian French
 Charles Rothe
 Mike Comford
 John Oleson
 Fred Hawley

References

External links
 1873: Related Documents from Wisconsin Legislature

1873 in Wisconsin
Wisconsin
Wisconsin legislative sessions